Midnight Ride is the fifth studio album by American rock band Paul Revere & the Raiders; released by Columbia Records (CS 9308). Produced by Terry Melcher and released in May 1966, the album featured the U.S. top five single "Kicks." 
The album also includes "(I'm Not Your) Steppin' Stone," The Monkees' version of which became a U.S. Top 20 hit in 1967.

The album is unique in the band's discography in that it contains songwriting credits by all five bandmembers. 
Stylistic changes, combined with arguments over which group members were to get their songs included on the band's albums, resulted in lead guitarist Drake Levin quitting the group following the release of Midnight Ride. The album also marked the end of the band's relationship with the Brill Building music publishing house, where "Kicks" and "(I'm Not Your) Steppin' Stone" were written.

Release and reception 
Midnight Ride peaked at number nine on the U.S. Billboard 200 albums chart. 
The album was certified gold in the U.S. on March 20, 1967. 
Music critic Bruce Eder said the album "marked just about the pinnacle of Paul Revere & the Raiders' history as a source of great albums." 
The album was described in Billboard magazine as a "package of hard driving, pulsating rockers." 
Serene Dominic of the Phoenix New Times called the album "proof that [the band] squandered not a minute of that massive TV exposure."
It is listed in the book 1001 Albums You Must Hear Before You Die by Robert Dimery and Michael Lydon.

In 1986 the song "Kicks" was covered by the Monkees as an album track on their album Then & Now... The Best of The Monkees.

Midnight Ride was remastered and re-released on February 1, 2000 by Sundazed Records with bonus tracks.

Track listing

Sundazed Records 2000 version
 "Kicks" (Mann, Weil) — 2:28
 "There's Always Tomorrow" (Levin, Smith) — 2:39
 "Little Girl in the 4th Row" (Lindsay, Revere) — 2:58
 "Ballad of a Useless Man" (Levin) — 2:08
 "(I'm Not Your) Steppin' Stone" (Boyce, Hart) — 2:31
 "There She Goes" (Lindsay, Revere) — 1:47
 "All I Really Need Is You" (Lindsay, Revere) — 3:27
 "Get It On" (Levin, Volk) — 3:12
 "Louie, Go Home" (Lindsay, Revere) — 2:41
 "Take a Look at Yourself" (Lindsay, Revere) — 1:48
 "Melody For an Unknown Girl" (Lindsay, Revere) — 1:59
 "Shake It Up" (Bonus track)
 "Little Girl In The 4th Row" (Italian Version) (Bonus track)
 "SS 396" (Bonus track)
 "Corvair Baby" (Bonus track)

Chart performance

Credits and personnel 
 Mark Lindsay – lead vocals (1, 3-7, 9-11), percussion
 Drake Levin – guitar, backing vocals, liner notes
 Paul Revere – organ, backing vocals, arranger
 Phil "Fang" Volk – bass guitar, backing and lead (8) vocals, liner notes
 Mike "Smitty" Smith – drums, lead vocals (2)
 Hal Blaine – drums on "Kicks"
 Bob Irwin – mastering
 Terry Melcher – arranger, producer
 Rich Russell – design

References

External links 
 [ Midnight Ride] at Allmusic

1966 albums
Columbia Records albums
Parlophone albums
Albums produced by Terry Melcher
Paul Revere & the Raiders albums